The Trap Door is a video game published for the ZX Spectrum in 1986 by Piranha Software and ported to the Amstrad CPC and Commodore 64 by Five Ways Software. It was written by Don Priestley and based on the British children's television show of the same name.

Gameplay

In Trap Door, the player takes control of Berk, who must perform tasks for "The Thing Upstairs", a never-seen entity who lives in the upper floors of the castle where Berk works. In order to help him complete his task, Berk must make use of the many objects lying around his part of the castle as well as the creatures that emerge from the trap door. Berk is assisted by Boni, a talking skull, who provides hints when picked up. He is also somewhat hindered by Drutt, Berk's pet who loves eating worms, as well as The Thing's impatience which manifests in form of a time limit for each task.

Gameplay is largely based around puzzle-solving and the use and manipulation of the many objects littered around Berk's chambers. Berk will also need help from some of the strange creatures that lurk in the caverns under the trap door and these creatures can often be as much a hindrance as a help (as well as downright dangerous). Once Berk has finished taking advantage of a creature's "assistance" he also has to find a way of making sure it goes back down the trap door.

The game has two different skill levels: "Learner Berk" and "Super Berk".  The difference is that "Super Berk" mode includes flying ghosts that appear a set time after each task is announced.  The ghosts hinder the player's progress by attacking Berk, sending him spinning into another room if he does not manage to avoid them.

Tasks
Over the course of the game, The Thing asks Berk four meals:
 A can of worms that must be collected once they come through the Trap Door
 Crushed eyeballs which grow as plants and must be squeezed in a cauldron using a pogo stick monster
 Boiled "slimies" that must be collected in a swamp in the cellar and boiled in the cauldron using a fire-breathing monster on wheels
 Fried eggs which must be acquired by hitting a bird with a suppository-shaped projectile
After each meal is done, Berk must deliver it upstairs using a dumbwaiter.

Once all four meals have been delivered on time, Berk must clean up the castle by shoving every monster - including Boni and Drutt - down the Trap Door; if the game is in "Super Berk" mode, The Thing will then send down a safe as a reward, which Berk must crack open to complete the game successfully.

Development
To promote the release of The Trap Door, Piranha Software partnered with Computer Gamer magazine to run a contest wherein readers submitted recipes for the Thing Upstairs, and 25 winning entrants received a copy of the game.

Reception

The game was runner up for the 'Best Original Game' of the year award at the 1987 Golden Joystick Awards.

Legacy
The Trap Door was followed by a sequel in 1987 called Through The Trap Door, also written by Priestley and published by Piranha.  This sequel is a multi-level platform game in which the player can switch between controlling Berk and Drutt.

See also
Flunky

References

External links

1986 video games
Amstrad CPC games
Commodore 64 games
ZX Spectrum games
Europe-exclusive video games
Video games based on animated television series
Video games developed in the United Kingdom
Video games set in castles